Pb is the chemical symbol for the chemical element lead. PB, P.B., or Pb may also refer to:ML

Arts and entertainment

Music
 Paul's Boutique, a 1989 album by American hip-hop group the Beastie Boys
 Prussian Blue, an American white nationalist pop pre-teen duo

Publications
 Performance Bikes (magazine), a monthly British motorcycling magazine
 Playboy, an American men's magazine
 Post-Bulletin, an American daily newspaper based in Rochester, Minnesota

Television
 Princess Bubblegum, a character from the 2010 animated TV series Adventure Time
 Prison Break, an American drama television series which originally ran from 2005 to 2009
 Puppy Bowl, an American special based on the Super Bowl airing each year on Animal Planet since 2005

Anime-Manga

Phantom Blood, the first story arc of shōnen manga series Jojo's Bizarre Adventure

Companies and organizations
 Packard Bell Corporation, an American radio manufacturer formed in 1933 that later became a defense contractor and manufacturer of other consumer electronics
 Packard Bell, a Dutch computer manufacturer which took its name from the earlier American company
 Palladium Books, a publisher of role-playing games
 Panera Bread, a chain of bakery–café quick casual restaurants in the United States and Canada
 Parsons Brinckerhoff, an American professional services firm, now a part of WSP
 PBair, a now-defunct Thai airline
 Photobucket, an image hosting, video hosting, slideshow creation and photo sharing website
 Piranha Bytes, a German video game developer
 Pirate Bay, a file-sharing organization
 Pitney Bowes, an American manufacturer of software and hardware and a provider of services related to documents, packaging, mailing, and shipping
 PocketBook International, a producer of e-book readers under the PocketBook brand
 Pottery Barn, an American-based home furnishing retail store chain
 ProBoards, an online message board service
 Prosperity Party (Paartii Badhaadhiinaa), a political party in Ethiopia

Economics and finance
 Payback period, in capital budgeting refers to the period of time required for the return on an investment to "repay" the sum of the original investment
 Performance bond, a surety bond issued by an insurance company or a bank to guarantee satisfactory completion of a project by a contractor
 Premium Bond, a lottery bond issued by the United Kingdom government's National Savings and Investments scheme
 Price-to-book ratio, a financial ratio used to compare a company's book value to its current market price
 Prime brokerage
 Participatory budgeting, a process of democratic deliberation to allocate parts of a public budget

Education
 Brunei Polytechnic, a post-secondary institution in Brunei
 Philosophy and Belief, a school subject
 Project Blogger, an Irish educational initiative
 Library of Congress Classification:Class P, subclass PB -- Modern languages and Celtic languages

People
 Panda Bear (musician) (born 1978), an experimental American musician and founding member of Animal Collective
 Chris Pontius (born 1974), an American entertainer and daredevil nicknamed "Party Boy"

Places

United States
 Pacific Beach, San Diego, California a neighborhood in San Diego, California
 Palm Bay, Florida
 Palm Beach, Florida
 Pine Bluff, Arkansas
 Pismo Beach, California

Other countries
 Paraíba, a state of Brazil
 Port Blair, a town in the Andaman Islands
 Punjab (disambiguation), the name of several locations in South Asia
 Paderborn, town in Germany, known by its vehicle registration code PB
 Považská Bystrica, town in Slovakia, known by its vehicle registration code PB
 CIA cryptonym for Guatemala.

Science and technology

Chemistry
 Lead, symbol Pb, a chemical element
 Polybutylene, a polymer of the substance butylene

Computing and software
 Petabit (Pb), a unit of information equivalent to 1000 terabits used, for example, to quantify computer memory or storage capacity
 Petabyte (PB), a unit of information equivalent to 1000 terabytes which is used, for example, to quantify computer memory or storage capacity
 PowerBook, a line of laptop computers produced by Apple
 PowerBuilder, an integrated software development environment
 PunkBuster, a computer program that is designed to detect software used for cheating in online games

Medicine
 Peripheral blood, deoxygenated blood in the circulatory system
 Phenobarbital, a barbiturate

Other uses in science and technology

 PB (pistol), a Soviet silenced pistol intended for army reconnaissance groups and the KGB
 Picobarn, one trillionth of a barn, a unit of area used in physics
 Pipe bomb, an improvised explosive device consisting of a tightly sealed section of pipe filled with an explosive material
 Push button, a momentary button that is activated only while pressed by user

Sports
 Personal Best, the best time or score ever achieved by an athlete in a particular event.
 Paintball, a sport in which players tag opponents by firing dye capsules from a paintball gun
 Passed ball, in baseball

Transportation
 Patrol boat, a relatively small naval vessel generally designed for coastal defense duties
 Pilatus Railway or Pilatusbahn, a mountain railway in Switzerland
 Irizar PB, a bus coach body

Other uses
 Paperback, a type of book
 Peanut butter, a food paste made primarily from ground dry roasted peanuts
 Powerball, an American lottery game
 Presiding Bishop, an ecclesiastical position in some denominations of Christianity
 Pro bono, professional work undertaken voluntarily for little or no payment as a public service
 Plant Based, a diet consisting mostly or entirely of plant-based foods

See also
 BP (disambiguation)